Wilhelmus van Nimwegen (27 June 1890 – 31 October 1958) was a Dutch weightlifter. He competed in the men's lightweight event at the 1920 Summer Olympics.

References

External links
 

1890 births
1958 deaths
Dutch male weightlifters
Olympic weightlifters of the Netherlands
Weightlifters at the 1920 Summer Olympics
Sportspeople from Amsterdam
20th-century Dutch people